Harry Thomas Berte (May 10, 1872 – May 6, 1952) was a Major League Baseball player. Williams played for the St. Louis Cardinals in the 1903 season. In four games, he had five hits in 15 at-bats, with one walk.

He was born in Covington, Kentucky and died in Los Angeles, California.

External links

1872 births
1952 deaths
Baseball players from Kentucky
Sportspeople from Covington, Kentucky
St. Louis Cardinals players
Minor league baseball managers
Nashville Tigers players
Mobile Bluebirds players
Richmond Blue Birds players
Richmond Bluebirds players
Richmond Giants players
Quincy Little Giants players
Atchison Huskers players
Ottumwa Giants players
Dayton Veterans players
Youngstown Little Giants players
Toronto Canucks players
Sioux City Cornhuskers players
Cedar Rapids Rabbitts players
Indianapolis Hoosiers (minor league) players
Cedar Rapids Rabbits players
Evansville River Rats players
Jacksonville Jacks players
Jacksonville Lunatics players
Jacksonville Braves (Central Association) players
Keokuk Indians players
Kearney Kapitalists players
Fort Scott Giants players